1791 Patsayev is a dark background asteroid from the central region of the asteroid belt, approximately 26 kilometers in diameter. It was discovered on 4 September 1967, by Russian astronomer Tamara Smirnova at the Crimean Astrophysical Observatory in Nauchnyj, on the Crimean peninsula. The asteroid was named after cosmonaut Viktor Patsayev.

Orbit and classification 

The dark C-type asteroid orbits the Sun in the central main-belt at a distance of 2.4–3.1 AU once every 4 years and 7 months (1,664 days). Its orbit has an eccentricity of 0.14 and an inclination of 5° with respect to the ecliptic.

Physical characteristics

Rotation period 

In April 2016, a rotational lightcurve of Patsayev was obtained from photometric observations taken by Sydney Black at the Oakley Southern Sky Observatory in Coonabarabran, Australia. It gave a well-defined rotation period of 19.809 hours with a brightness variation of 0.28 in magnitude.

Diameter and albedo 

According to the survey carried out by NASA's Wide-field Infrared Survey Explorer with its subsequent NEOWISE mission, Patsayev measures between 29.39 and 31.50 kilometers in diameter, and its surface has a high albedo between 0.030 and 0.039. The Collaborative Asteroid Lightcurve Link (CALL) disagrees with the results found by WISE. CALL derives a much lower carbonaceous albedo of 0.046, and calculates a diameter of 25.69 kilometers with an absolute magnitude of 11.9.

Naming 

This minor planet was named in honor of Russian–Soviet cosmonaut Viktor Patsayev (1933–1971), test Engineer of the Soyuz 11 spacecraft, who died on his first spaceflight on 30 June 1971 during the vehicle's return to Earth after completing the flight program of the first manned orbital station, Salyut. The lunar crater Patsaev is also named after him. The precedingly numbered minor planets 1789 Dobrovolsky and 1790 Volkov were named in honour of his dead crew members.

The names of all three cosmonauts are also engraved on the plaque next to the sculpture of the Fallen Astronaut on the Moon, which was placed there during the Apollo 15 mission, containing the names of eight American astronauts and six Soviet cosmonauts, who had all died in service. The official  was published by the Minor Planet Center on 1 July 1972.

References

External links 
 Asteroid Lightcurve Database (LCDB), query form (info )
 Dictionary of Minor Planet Names, Google books
 Asteroids and comets rotation curves, CdR – Observatoire de Genève, Raoul Behrend
 Discovery Circumstances: Numbered Minor Planets (1)-(5000) – Minor Planet Center
 
 

001791
Discoveries by Tamara Mikhaylovna Smirnova
Named minor planets
19670904